Chhend Colony is a mixed income group commercial-cum-residential area in the Western Region of Rourkela city, in Sundergarh district. Chhend Colony of Rourkela is situated in Trans Urban area of Rourkela. It is one of the largest colony of India in terms of area.

Overview

Chhend Colony comprises Kalinga Vihar, Gopabandhu Nagar, and Madhusudan Nagar and is close to Rourkela Airport and Rourkela Steel Plant. The area is famous for the private residential plot's and Management Institute of Rourkela Institute of Management Studies, Pharmacy College of Kanak Manjari Institute of Pharmaceutical Sciences and Universities of Biju Patnaik University of Technology. The area is one of the most populous colony of the Rourkela city with a population of around 3.5 lakhs.

Residential colonies
Phase 1.
Phase 2.
Phase 3.
Kalinga Vihar.
Gopabandhu Nagar.
Madhusudan Nagar.
TISCO Colony.
Saraswati Colony.
Kalyani Nagar.

Co-Operative Colony.
Kaushalya Vihar.
Kishan Tola.
Chhend Basti.
RDA Colony.
Pradhanpalli.
New Bank Colony.
OPTCL Colony.

Education 
Biju Patnaik University of Technology

Rourkela Institute of Management Studies
Kanak Manjari Institute of Pharmaceutical Sciences
Chinmaya Vidyalaya EM School
Utkalmani Gopabandhu Institute of Engineering, Rourkela
J. P. Motion Pictures, Rourkela.
Government ITI, Rourkela
Hrushikesh Ray Mahavidyalya
St. Thomas English School, Kalinga Vihar

Nearest Transport Means

References

Sundergarh district
Neighbourhoods in Rourkela